Stefan Airapetjan (born 24 December 1997), known simply as Stefan, is an Estonian singer and songwriter, best known for winning the first edition of Maskis Laulja, the Estonian version of Masked Singer in 2020 and representing Estonia in the Eurovision Song Contest 2022 with the song "Hope", placing 13th in the final.

Early life 
Airapetjan was born and raised in Viljandi, Estonia as the son of Armenian immigrants. He has a sister named Stefania.

Career

Early career 
Airapetjan has been singing since his early childhood, with Hedi-Kai Pai his vocal coach, and won a number of contests. In 2010, he entered Laulukarussell, a singing competition for children organised by Eesti Rahvusringhääling, and reached the final.

2018–2020: Eesti Laul and Maskis Laulja 
Airapetjan entered the music competition Eesti Laul on four occasions, winning once. His first entry was in 2018 as part of a duo called Vajé with the song "Laura (Walk with Me)", finishing third in the superfinal. His first solo entry was in 2019 with the song "Without You", which won the jury vote in the grand final and qualified for the superfinal, finishing third. He then entered in 2020 with the song "By My Side", which finished seventh in the grand final. 

In 2020, Airapetjan won as Aries in the first edition of The Masked Singer.  He made his way to the finals, where he was declared the winner of the competition.

2022–present: Return to Eesti Laul and Eurovision 

In 2022, Airapetjan participated in Eesti Laul 2022 with the song "Hope" and won, besting out 40 entries. The win earned him the right to represent Estonia in the Eurovision Song Contest 2022 in Turin. In the Eurovision Song Contest, he performed 12th in the second semi-final and placed 5th, which qualified him to the final. In the final, he finished 13th place overall with 141 points.

Discography

Studio albums

Singles

As lead artist

As featured artist

As part of Vajé

References

External links 
 

1997 births
Living people
21st-century Estonian male singers
Eesti Laul winners
Estonian people of Armenian descent
Masked Singer winners
Eurovision Song Contest entrants for Estonia
Eurovision Song Contest entrants of 2022
People from Viljandi